China National Highway 350 runs from Lichuan, Hubei to Luhuo County in Sichuan. The last section in Sichuan is noted for its scenic route through mountainous landscape. In Zhong County, Chongqing, it crosses the Yangtze's Sanxia Reservoir over Zhongxian Yangtze River Bridge.

Route

References

See also 

 China National Highways

Transport in Sichuan
350
Transport in Chongqing
Transport in Hubei